Musnad Ishaq Ibn Rahwayh, is one of the oldest Hadith book compiled by Imam Ishaq Ibn Rahwayh (d. 853 A.D)., who is the teacher of famous Scholars of Hadiths including Imam Muhammad al-Bukhari, Imam Muslim, Imam Al-Tirmidhi & Imam Al-Nasa'i.

Description
The book contains two thousand four hundred & twenty five (2425) hadiths according to Maktaba Shamila. It is one of the oldest Musnad ( a kind of Hadith book) written. It is written in first century of Islamic Calendar and written before the most authentic book of Hadiths (narrations of the Islamic prophet, Muhammad) that are Sahihain (Sahih al-Bukhari & Sahih Muslim). The Musnad (مسند) are collections of Hadiths which are classified by narrators, and therefore by Sahabas (companions of Muhammad). The books contain both Authentic and weak narrations.

Publications
The book has been published by many organizations around the world: 
   Musnad Ishaq Ibn Rahwayh (مسند إسحاق بن راهويه) by Ishaq Ibn Rahwayh: Published:  Dar al-Kitab al-Arabi, Beirut, 2002 
   Musnad Isḥāq ibn Rāhwayh: Published:  al-Madīnah : Tawzīʻ Maktabat al-Īmān, 1990-1991. (Beirut, Lebanon)

See also
 List of Sunni books
 Kutub al-Sittah
 Sahih Muslim
 Jami al-Tirmidhi
 Sunan Abu Dawood
 Jami' at-Tirmidhi
 Either: Sunan ibn Majah, Muwatta Malik

References

9th-century Arabic books
10th-century Arabic books
Sunni literature
Hadith
Hadith collections
Sunni hadith collections